Granger House may refer to:

in the United States (by state then town or city)
Granger House (Marion, Iowa), listed on the National Register of Historic Places (NRHP) in Linn County
Francis Granger House, Canandaigua, New York, NRHP-listed
Granger Cottage, Canandaigua, New York, NRHP-listed
Granger House and The Perch, Austin, Texas, NRHP-listed

See also
Granger Hall (historic place), National City, California, NRHP-listed
Granger Station, Granger, Wyoming, NRHP-listed
The Grange (disambiguation)
List of Grange Hall buildings